The 2009–10 season was Stoke City's second season in the Premier League and the 54th in the top tier of English football.

After a successful first season in the Premier League, Stoke were looking to establish themselves in the top tier and spent just over £20 million on Diego Arismendi, Danny Collins, Robert Huth, Tuncay and Dean Whitehead. Stoke began the season with victories over Burnley, Sunderland, and West Ham United, and a 1–0 win at Tottenham Hotspur in October. Their form dropped off in December as they managed just a point and two goals in five matches.

Stoke began 2010 in fine form going eleven matches unbeaten, which included wins against Fulham, Blackburn Rovers and Portsmouth, whilst draws were earned against Liverpool and Manchester City. The run also included FA Cup wins against York City, Arsenal and Manchester City before City lost to Chelsea in the quarter final stage. Stoke had no relegation battle to be concerned with and finished the campaign in 11th position with 47 points.

Pre-season
Stoke began their preparation for the 2009–10 season with two Stoke XIs playing matches simultaneously against local non-league sides Newcastle Town and Nantwich Town. Both matches were surprisingly lost, 2–1 at Newcastle and 2–0 at Nantwich. Stoke then spent a week at a training camp in Austria where they played twice. Firstly against German side St Pauli in Irdning, Dave Kitson scoring in a 3–1 defeat. The other match was against Israeli side Hapoel Tel Aviv where Stoke had to play in a green strip due to a colour clash, Salif Diao scored Stoke's goal in a 1–1 draw, a lob from 40-yards. On their return to England, Stoke completed the signing of Sunderland midfielder Dean Whitehead for a fee of £5 million. Two goals from Neil Mellor saw Preston North End beat Stoke 2–1 with Richard Cresswell scoring for the Potters against his former employers.

Stoke then played back to back games against East Midlands opposition. Firstly they drew 1–1 at Nottingham Forest on 29 July with Dave Kitson cancelling out a strike from Nathan Tyson. Then against Derby County despite taking the lead twice via Liam Lawrence and Ricardo Fuller goals from Stephen Pearson and Arnaud Mendy earned Derby a 2–2 draw. Stoke's final match of pre-season was against Spanish side Real Valladolid at the Britannia Stadium where they made a bright start scoring through Abdoulaye Faye after two minutes before Dave Kitson converted a 32nd-minute penalty. However goals from Borja and Alberto Bueno saw that match end in a 2–2 draw and leave Stoke without a victory in pre-season. On 14 October 2009 a Stoke City XI lost 1–0 in a friendly against American sister club Austin Aztex at Nantwich Town's Weaver Stadium.

Premier League

August

For the season opener against Burnley Stoke gave new signing Dean Whitehead his debut. Newly promoted Burnley started brightly and went close through Robbie Blake. However City soon took control of the match and went in front after 19 minutes through Ryan Shawcross, before a trademark Rory Delap long throw-in was glanced into his own net by defender Stephen Jordan to put Stoke into a 2–0 lead. The away side improved in the second half but failed to trouble Sorensen and Stoke could have added a third with Dave Kitson hitting the post and Richard Cresswell narrowly shooting wide.

Stoke travelled to Liverpool for three away games back to back. Stoke line up in an unusual 4-5-1 formation in an attempt to stop the threat of Liverpool's attacking full-backs. The change in tactics backfired as Liverpool comfortably won the game 4–0 with the goals coming from Fernando Torres, Dirk Kuyt, Glen Johnson and David N'Gog.

Another newly promoted side were next opponents for Stoke in the form of Birmingham City at St Andrew's. Stoke suffered an early blow as James Beattie was forced to come off due to injury, meaning that Dave Kitson would have a chance to impress. There were few chances during the match with both sides cancelling each other out and the match finished 0–0.

New signings from Middlesbrough Robert Huth and Tuncay were on the bench for the visit of Steve Bruce's Sunderland at the end of August. Stoke opened the scoring just before half time through a goal mouth scramble which Kitson managed to put past Craig Gordon. Both sides continued to create chances in the second half but Stoke were the stronger of the two teams and were able to see out the win.

September

For the visit of Chelsea Pulis decided to play a 5-3-2 formation with new signing Danny Collins making his debut. Stoke suffered an early setback as James Beattie again was forced to come off after falling awkwardly. Stoke took the lead after 32 minutes after a mix up in the Chelsea defence allowed captain Abdoulaye Faye to head into an empty net. Stoke were dealt another injury this time 'keeper Sorensen, who was replaced by Simonsen. Chelsea equalised in stoppage time in the first half through a goal by Drogba. Chelsea dominated the second half without troubling Simonsen and it looked that it would finish all level but Malouda gave Chelsea the three points deep into injury time to leave Stoke with a sense of deja vu as Chelsea beat in them in the same fashion last season.

Stoke then made the trip to the Reebok Stadium looking to avenge last seasons 3–1 defeat in what was City's first game in the Premier League. Stoke were the better side in the first half as they dominated possession and created a number of half chances, Bolton on the other hand were awful and were booed off at half time. Stoke took the lead early in the second half through the improving Kitson, Wanderers then brought on Ricardo Gardner and Ivan Klasnić to try and rescue a point for the home side. They did get a draw via the penalty spot after Danny Collins carelessly tripped Sam Ricketts in the final minute.

Following the epic 4–3 League Cup win over Blackpool Stoke faced the league champions, Manchester United. Pulis decided to go with the same formation and system he used against Chelsea, however the change didn't work as the visitors were able to claim a comfortable 2–0 win.

October

Stoke reverted to their usual formation for trip to Everton and gave a surprise start to Salif Diao after the midfielder's injury. Everton were the better team in the first 45 minutes without troubling Sorensen, Stoke improved in the second period and took the lead through Robert Huth's powerful header, his first goal for the club. The lead didn't last long as Leon Osman scored from long range and the match ended all square.

The next match was against Gianfranco Zola's West Ham United at the Britannia Stadium. James Beattie scored twice for Stoke in a 2–1 win. The first came via the penalty spot after Etherington had been brought down in the area by Julien Faubert. West Ham levelled though a Matthew Upson header before Beattie tapped in from close range following good work by Fuller. Huth was given a retrospective three-match ban by the FA after video footage showed him hitting Upson in the face.

Stoke then made the trip to White Hart Lane to face Tottenham and were handed a blow before kick off with Thomas Sorensen unable to play meaning that number two Steve Simonsen started in goal. Tottenham were also hit by injuries with Jonathan Woodgate being forced off after 14 minutes. Tottenham dominated the match and had numerous chances to open the scoring but they were repeatedly denied by Simonsen. With the match looking to heading to a goalless draw, Stoke scored via a counter-attack with Glenn Whelan curling a shot past Heurelho Gomes to secure a 1–0 victory.

In the match against local rivals Wolverhampton Wanderers, Stoke dominated the first half and scored through Beattie and a volley by Matthew Etherington his first league goal for the club put Stoke 2–0 up before half time. In the second half Wolves were the dominant side and also scored twice with two identical goals from former City player Jody Craddock as the match ended in a 2–2 draw.

November

Stoke made the trip to Hull looking for a second consecutive away win; despite a slow start City took the lead through Etherington's powerful drive past Matt Duke. Stoke could have extended their lead through Shawcross but his header clipped the crossbar. Hull then equalised through former City player Seyi Olofinjana and Stoke were on the back foot even more when Abdoulaye Faye was sent off for two bookable offences meaning Tuncay who had just come on had to be replaced by Wilkinson in order to fill in the gap in defence. However Jan Vennegoor of Hesselink scored in the final minute to condemn Stoke to a disappointing defeat.

Paul Hart's relegation threatened side, Portsmouth were next to arrive in Staffordshire and had the chance to take the lead early on after Delap had fouled Aruna Dindane but Kevin-Prince Boateng's penalty was saved by Sorensen. It turned out to be a very poor game and Stoke scored the only goal through a well worked move resulting in Fuller scoring his first goal of the season.

Stoke travelled to Blackburn and had a number of chances to win the match with Whitehead and Beattie both missing from just 5 yards, Blackburn were also guilty of poor finishing and the match ended in a 0–0 draw.

December

The first match in December came away against Arsenal; Stoke started the match brightly and looked comfortable but Delap again gave away a penalty after fouling Andrey Arshavin in the area but Sorensen saved Fabregas' spot kick. However Arsenal were not to be denied and went on to win the match 2–0 with goals from Arshavin and Aaron Ramsey. The results was however overshadowed by media reports of a dressing room argument between Pulis and Beattie.

Stoke then faced Wigan Athletic in an early kick-off at the Britannia Stadium it what turned out to be an entertaining match. Wigan took the lead in confusing circumstances, Emmerson Boyce headed the ball past Sorensen taking out the keeper in the process and Salif Diao unavoidably kicked Boyce in the head and the referee belatedly awarded the goal. Stoke equalised through Tuncay's first goal for the club just before half time. Wigan went back in front through via a 50-yard strike by Maynor Figueroa but Stoke scored instantly through a Shawcross header. Wigan had the chance to win the match in the final minute when Huth was adjudged to have fouled Jordi Gomez despite the Wigan player being offside, however Sorensen saved Hugo Rodallega's spot kick.

City travelled to Villa Park and thought they had taken the lead through Mama Sidibé out-jumped Stephen Warnock but referee Lee Probert gave a free-kick to Villa. Stoke were the better side and created a number of chances to score but were unable to find the net. Villa claimed all three points when John Carew headed past Sorensen.

The boxing day fixture saw Stoke make the trip to Manchester City where Roberto Mancini was taking his first game in charge for the home side. His new side made a bright start and two goals from Martin Petrov and Carlos Tevez gave Man City a 2–0 win.

City ended 2009 on a disappointing note as they were defeated 1–0 by Birmingham City at home. Stoke were the dominant team throughout the match and only some top class saves from Joe Hart kept Stoke out. Birmingham took advantage through a scrappy goal from Cameron Jerome.

January

The first league match of 2010 was the re-arranged fixture against Fulham; the match went ahead despite heavy snow. Sorensen failed to recover from an injury he picked up in the win over York City at the weekend, meaning that Simonsen started and youngster Danzelle St Louis-Hamilton appeared on the bench. Stoke controlled the first half and Fulham the second. Stoke opened the scoring 13 minutes when Tuncay met Robert Huth's flick on from Etherington's corner and powered the ball beyond Mark Schwarzer from 3-yards to put the hosts into the lead. A rampant City side didn't have to wait long to double their advantage though as skipper Faye was on hand to tap the ball into an empty net after Etherington's deep corner evaded a packed out 6-yard box. The majority of the Britannia Stadium had barely recovered from their celebrations by the time Sidibé had fired the Potters into a three-goal lead just three minutes later. The Malian international striker latched onto Higginbotham's clever flick on, as the Potters laid siege to the Fulham penalty area, and smashed the ball into the roof of the net with a clinically taken half volley to put Stoke into a 3–0 lead. In the second half Fulham scored twice through Damien Duff and Clint Dempsey.

A weak Liverpool side were next to arrive at the Britannia and were content to sit back and play for a draw. Stoke suffered an early injury problems with both Abdoualye Faye and Rory Delap being forced to come off. Liverpool took a surprise lead through Greek defender Sotirios Kyrgiakos in the second half, Stoke then applied intense pressure on the Liverpool goal and in the 90th minute Robert Huth scrambled in the equaliser.

February

After five home games in a row City finally had an away game at Sunderland. However the match was a very disappointing affair and finished in a poor 0–0 draw.

Stoke were back at home for the visit of Blackburn Rovers on a day dedicated to Sir Stanley Matthews. Stoke produced a fitting performance to mark the 10th anniversary of the death of the wizard of dribble by producing arguably City's best performance in the top flight since winning promotion in May 2008. Stoke opened their account through Danny Higginbotham after eight minutes with the left back volleying an Etherington corner. City made it two just before half time after Mama Sidibé tapped in from close range and Etherington finished of a man of the match outing by skilfully beating Robinson to make the score line 3–0, Stoke's largest Premier League win and biggest top flight win since 1984. After the match it was reported that a visiting Blackburn Rovers supporter had died at the match. His death was later ruled as 'misadventure' by the coroner after eyewitnesses stated that he had 'headed' a 25lb bin.

In the next away game at the DW Stadium Wigan made a bright start and took the lead through Paul Scharner after 14 minutes. Stoke improved greatly in the second half and equalised via a header from Tuncay and the match finished one apiece.

Following the FA Cup draw against Man City at the weekend, they were again the opposition this time at the Britannia Stadium in the League. Stoke made a confident start dominating the match and should have opened the scoring in the first half but the scores were level at half time. Stoke were reduced to ten men early in the second half when Abdoulaye Faye brought down Adebayor, Man City then took control but Stoke surprisingly took the lead through a volley from Glenn Whelan. Man City drew level via a scrappy goal from Gareth Barry, City thought they won the match with seconds left when Shawcross headed in a Delap throw in but Alan Wiley wrongly disallowed the goal.

Stoke then made the long trip south to face relegation bound Portsmouth at Fratton Park. Pompey were the better side in the first half and took the lead through the Frédéric Piquionne after 35 minutes. Stoke were better in the second half and Robert Huth levelled just after the half time break before Andy Wilkinson was sent off for a second bookable offence. With Pompey looking for a vital winner City snatched the win right at the death with Salif Diao scoring his first goal in seven years.

Following Stoke's FA Cup replay win over Man City at the Britannia, Arsenal were next to arrive and City took the lead through Danny Pugh via another Delap throw in, however Nicklas Bendtner equalised just before half time. In the second half Shawcross was sent-off for a tackle on Aaron Ramsey, which left the Arsenal midfielder with a broken leg. Arsenal made full used of their numerical advantage with goals from Cesc Fàbregas and Thomas Vermaelen.

March

After their FA Cup exit at Chelsea, Stoke faced struggling Burnley in the re-arranged match at Turf Moor. The match was a keenly contested affair and the result was a fair 1–1 draw with goals from Tuncay and Dave Nugent.

Stoke then had a hard-fought goalless draw with Aston Villa at the Britannia Stadium and both sides could have easily won the match.

Following a lethargic opening 45 minutes against Tottenham Hotspur the second half exploded into action as Eiður Guðjohnsen fired the visitors ahead just 30 seconds after the interval, before Dean Whitehead was dismissed by referee Mike Dean three minutes later for an innocuous looking challenge on Luka Modrić. The Potters had to stand firm to soak up some heavy Spurs' pressure, but managed to pull themselves back into the game on the hour mark when Etherington calmly converted from the penalty spot, after David Kitson had been dragged to the ground by Benoît Assou-Ekotto. Ricardo Fuller then spurned a glorious opportunity to turn the game on its head as he blazed over from 6-yards, before the Londoners ensured all three points would be theirs with little over ten minutes remaining as Croatian international Niko Kranjčar lashed home after Assou-Ekotto teed him up.

Stoke then made the trip to West Ham and came away with all three points thanks to a piece of individual piece of brilliance from substitute Ricardo Fuller. He had only been on the pitch two minutes by the time he beat two men and rifled the ball beyond Robert Green with little over twenty minutes of the game remaining. Prior to his introduction chances had been few and far between for both sides, with Egyptian Mido going closest for the Hammers, whilst Liam Lawrence had spurned the visitors best chance early on after blazing over from 12-yards. The Potters had to soak up a late onslaught from the desperate hosts, but they managed to hold on for all three points and elevate themselves up to tenth place in the league table; moving to within one point of the magic '40-point target'.

April
Relegation threatened Hull were next at the Britannia Stadium and Stoke came away with a comfortable 2–0 win. Fuller struck in the sixth minute to give the Potters a flying start against Iain Dowie's men before Liam Lawrence slotted home the second in the final minute to ease his side to the three points.

There was great excitement for highly awaited derby against Wolverhampton Wanderers at Molineux prior to the match, however the game was a total anti-climax and finished in a drab 0–0 draw.

City's penultimate home match saw Bolton Wanderers make the short trip south. Stoke dominated the match for 80 minutes and took the lead through Dave Kitson after 13 minutes. However Matthew Taylor somehow managed to score twice in the final few minutes to condemn Stoke to a surprise defeat.

In the next away match at Chelsea Stoke suffered early setbacks with both Faye and Sorensen being taken off injured. Everything seemed to go wrong for Stoke and Chelsea scored seven goals without reply.

May

In the final home match of the season Stoke picked up a well-earned point against in-form Everton. Neither side were able to find a breakthrough throughout the clash as Delap missed City's best opportunity in the second half whilst the Toffees thought they had won it through Phil Jagielka, only for Howard Webb to chalk it off for an infringement by Victor Anichebe late on.

Stoke's penultimate game of the season was against UEFA Europa League finalists Fulham at Craven Cottage. Stoke won the match 1–0 with Matthew Etherington scoring the only goal in the 83rd minute.

Stoke finished off the 2009–10 season with a 4–0 loss against Manchester United at Old Trafford.

Results

Final league table

FA Cup

Stoke were drawn at home to Conference Premier side York City at home in the third round of the FA Cup. The non-league side started the better side despite arriving late for kick-off and took a shock lead through Neil Barrett. However Stoke quickly turned the game around with two Rory Delap throws which led to Daniel Parslow putting through his own net and Ricardo Fuller scoring a minute later. Stoke sealed their place in the fourth round when Matthew Etherington curled in a free-kick just before the hour mark.

Arsenal were the next opponents for City and they made the perfect start, another Rory Delap throw caused panic in the Arsenal penalty area and Fuller took advantage. Arsenal slowly came back into the game and equalised through a lucky deflected Denílson free-kick just before half-time. In the second half both sides were attacking and after 78 minutes Fuller got his second of the game heading in a Mamady Sidibé cross. Dean Whitehead then got his first goal for Stoke confirming a fifth round tie.

Stoke were handed a tough test against Manchester City in round five. At a surprisingly sparse City of Manchester Stadium Man City took an early lead after Shaun Wright-Phillips took advantage of some awful Stoke defending. Stoke struggled in the first half and their cause was not helped by injuries to Matthew Etherington and his replacement Liam Lawrence. In the second half Stoke became more threatening and the equaliser came after 57 minutes after a Rory Delap thrown was headed in by Fuller. Both sides could have won afterwards but it finished 1–1 meaning that a replay would be needed.

In the replay Man City made a flying start putting the Stoke defence under a considerable amount of pressure with Emmanuel Adebayor, Craig Bellamy and Pablo Zabaleta missing good chances. In the second half it was Stoke who began to take control of the match and took the lead through Dave Kitson ten minutes from full-time. However Bellamy equalized moments later sending the tie into extra time. Man City were reduced to ten men when Adebayor was shown a red card after an altercation With Shawcross. Stoke re-took the lead through a Shawcross header from a Delap thrown and then Tuncay finished the game with a fine solo goal.

Stoke made into the Quarter Final of the FA Cup for the first time since 1971 and were drawn away at the holders and favourites Chelsea. Stoke made a good start almost taking the lead through Dean Whitehead after ten minutes. This was as good as it got for City as Chelsea produced a commanding display and took their place in the semi-final with goals from Frank Lampard and John Terry.

League Cup

Stoke started their League Cup campaign away to Leyton Orient. It was the first time the two sides have met in the League Cup and the first time since 1993. Stoke made 11 changes to the side that drew 0–0 with Birmingham City as manager Tony Pulis kept with his normal League cup side. Ryan Shotton made his first Stoke start and on the bench a number of youngsters such as Dave Parton and Matthew Lund appeared for the first time. In the first half Orient had the best chance when Adrian Pătulea should have scored but failed. Richard Cresswell should have done the same before Dave Kitson headed against the bar. With both teams failing to break the deadlock the match went into extra time. The winning goal came from Kitson a brilliant 35-yard strike his first in Stoke colours, sent City to the Third round to play Blackpool.	

In the Third round against Blackpool two of Stoke's summer signings Diego Arismendi and Tuncay made their first starts. Blackpool scored the game's opening goal just before half time when ex-Crewe player David Vaughan was allowed to run and shot to put the Tangerines in front. It got worse for City as after half-time Billy Clarke one of the smallest players on the pitch managed to out jump a static Stoke defence and but Blackpool 2–0 up. That goal seemed to lift Stoke as they went all out to get back in the game. Alex Baptiste fouled Tuncay in the area and Liam Lawrence took the spot kick which was easily save by Matthew Gilks. Higginbotham pulled one back before Etherington scored his first goal for Stoke. Fuller and Tuncay combined to put Stoke in front however minutes later Ben Burgess made it 3–3 and it looked like it was going to extra time before Andy Griffin sealed a 4–3 win for Stoke.

In the Fourth round Stoke were handed an unwanted trip to Portsmouth. Stoke took the decision to fly to the South coast to avoid the long journey. It didn't have the desired effect, as Portsmouth with the help of some comic Stoke defending easily won the match 4–0. It didn't get any better as on the flight back the aircraft had to make an emergency landing due to an oil leak.

Squad statistics

Transfers

In

Out

Loan out

References

Stoke City
Stoke City F.C. seasons